Commanding General's Quarters, Quantico Marine Base, also known as Building Number 1 and Quarters 1, is a historic home located at Marine Corps Base Quantico, Quantico, Prince William County, Virginia. It was built in 1920, and is a large, two-story, concrete-block-and-frame, Dutch Colonial Revival style house.  The main block consists of a two-story, five-bay, symmetrical, gambrel-roofed central block with lower level walls covered with stucco.  It has flanking wings consisting of a service wing and wing with a porch and second story addition.  Also on the property is a contributing two-car, hipped roof, stucco-covered garage. The house is a contributing resource with the Quantico Marine Base Historic District.

It was added to the National Register of Historic Places in 2009.

References

Houses on the National Register of Historic Places in Virginia
Houses completed in 1920
Houses in Prince William County, Virginia
National Register of Historic Places in Prince William County, Virginia